The Central District of Baft County is a district (bakhsh) in Baft County, Kerman Province, Iran. At the 2006 census, its population (including those portions later split off to form Arzuiyeh County) was 68,270, in 16,394 families; excluding those portions, the population in 2006 was 64,743, in 15,520 families.  The district has two cities: Baft and Bezenjan.  The district has six rural districts (dehestan): Bezenjan Rural District, Dashtab Rural District, Fathabad Rural District, Gughar Rural District, Khabar Rural District, and Kiskan Rural District.

References 

Baft County
Districts of Kerman Province